Oncideres rubra is a species of beetle in the family Cerambycidae. It was described by Franz in 1959. It is known from Costa Rica and Mexico.

References

rubra
Beetles described in 1959